YPO may refer to:

 Yorkshire Purchasing Organisation
 Young Patriots Organization, American left-wing organization of the 1960s and 1970s
 Young Presidents' Organization, a global network of young chief executives
 Yellowknife Post Office
 Yerington Post Office
 Yungaburra Post Office, Queensland, Australia
 Peawanuck Airport, Peawanuck, Ontario, Canada